Mudza is a village in Bramhapuri tehsil of Chandrapur district in the state of Maharashtra, India.  The village had a population of 3659 as on census of 2011.

Notes

Villages in Chandrapur district